Tasmania 40° South is an independent  Australian  magazine focusing on the society, culture and lifestyle of Tasmania. It has been published quarterly since 1997. It was once described by Hobart's Mercury newspaper as "a lifestyle magazine with brains".

References

External links
  website

Cultural magazines
Culture of Tasmania
Local interest magazines
Magazines established in 1997
Quarterly magazines published in Australia
Lifestyle magazines published in Australia